Benjamin Shenstone "Sport" Donnelly (October 18, 1869 – August 3, 1922) was an American football player and coach. He was the second-ever known professional football player, after Pudge Heffelfinger. He was paid $250 for one game on November 19, 1892 by the Allegheny Athletic Association, for a game against the Washington & Jefferson Presidents football team. The November 19 date was exactly seven days after the team paid Heffelfinger $500 for a game. In 1893, Donnelly was hired by the Allegheny Athletic Association as player-coach, making him the first man to ever coach a known pro team. Heffelfinger once said that Donnelly was the only man that he had played against who "could slug you and at the same time keep his eyes on the ball". Donnelly also served as the second head football coach at the University of Iowa for a single season in 1893, compiling a record of 3–4.

College football playing career
Donnelly began his college football career at Princeton University. While at Princeton, Donnelly was a star end on the Princeton Tigers football team.

Professional playing career
Aside from playing with Allegheny in 1892, Donnelly also played with the Chicago Athletic Association that same year. He also played for the Manhattan Athletic Club in 1891. There were allegations that he was guilty of unsportsmanlike conduct on a field. One of his stunts was to purposely punch an opponent, then go to the referee and say, "Watch this guy. He's been slugging me all day." Once that player retaliated on the next play, under the watchful eye of the ref, he would then be thrown out of the game. In a Chicago game against the New York Cresants, the Cresants refused to take field unless Donnelly was barred from the Chicago lineup because of some alleged rough tactics he used while playing for Manhattan, the year before. Chicago benched Donnelly, and his absence resulted in a tie. Donnelly then became enraged and refused to rejoin the team in Chicago. Pudge Heffelfinger, who was also playing for Chicago, joined Donnelly in the walk-out. After this game he was once again recruited by Allegheny, to play for them. A few weeks later, Donnelly and Heffelfinger were professional players with the team. Donnelly played with Allegheny in 1892, 1893 and 1894.

Donnelly later returned to Chicago and became the team's head coach. In 1896, Allegheny asked him if he and any of his Chicago players might be interested in playing for money. The Alleghenys were then told word that more than half of the Chicago players would be willing to come to Pittsburgh as soon as their team finished its traditional eastern tour.

Donnelly, Langdon Lea, and Heffelfinger also reportedly played some games on the West Coast during the mid-1890s.

College coaching career
In 1891, he was made an assistant coach at Purdue University by his friend Knowlton Ames. Under Ames and Donnelly, Purdue would go 12–0 over the next two seasons. In 1891 while posting a 4–0 record, the team outscored its opponents 192–0. Then again in 1892, while posting an 8–0 record, the team outscored its opponents 320–24. Ames and Donnelly left the school in 1892.

Donnelly was also the second ever football coach at the University of Iowa. He was hired for two weeks prior to the 1893 season. Unlike his predecessor, Donnelly was generally disliked by the Hawkeye players. After the Alleghenys' 1896 season, Donnelly went to Washington & Jefferson to become an assistant coach there.

Death
Donnelly died in Manhattan, on August 3, 1922.

Head coaching record

College

References

External links
 

1869 births
1922 deaths
19th-century players of American football
American football ends
Player-coaches
Allegheny Athletic Association players
Chicago Athletic Association players
Iowa Hawkeyes football coaches
Princeton Tigers football players
Purdue Boilermakers football coaches
Washington & Jefferson Presidents football coaches
Players of American football from Chicago